This list of Wheaton College alumni includes notable individuals who studied as undergraduates or graduate students at Wheaton College (Illinois).

Academia
 Bart D. Ehrman, 1978 – Distinguished Professor of Religious Studies at the University of North Carolina at Chapel Hill
 C. Stephen Evans, BA philosophy, 1969 – University Professor of Philosophy and the Humanities at Baylor University
 Nathan O. Hatch, (summa cum laude) 1968 – former president of Wake Forest University and provost of University of Notre Dame
 Arthur F. Holmes – philosopher and professor at Wheaton College
 Douglas Jacobsen, BA philosophy, 1973 – scholar of global Christianity, Distinguished Professor at Messiah University
 Walter Kaiser Jr. – Old Testament scholar
 Robert A. Kraft – historian of early Judaism and Christianity at the University of Pennsylvania
  Merritt Maduke, BS chemistry (summa cum laude), 1989 – Associate Professor of Molecular & Cellular Physiology at Stanford University
 Gerald P. McKenny, BA philosophy, 1979 – Walter Professor of Theology at University of Notre Dame
 Niel B. Nielson, BA philosophy, 1976 – former president of Covenant College
 Mark Noll, BA English – professor of history at University of Notre Dame
 Phil Ryken, BA English literature and philosophy, 1988 – former pastor of Tenth Presbyterian Church and current president of Wheaton College
 Daniel W. Smith, BA literature
 John H. Walton – Old Testament scholar
 Marvin R. Wilson, BA history – Professor of Biblical Studies at Gordon College

Business
 Dwayne Andreas. former CEO of Archer Daniels Midland ADM
 Robert Van Kampen, 1960, founder of the investment banking firm Van Kampen
 Robert W. Lane, former CEO of John Deere
 C. William Pollard, former chairman and CEO of ServiceMaster

Civil Rights
 C. Herbert Oliver, civil rights activist

Media, arts and entertainment
 Jim Abel – singer-songwriter
 Nuala Archer – Irish-American poet
Sarah Pulliam Bailey, BA communications, 2008 – journalist, The Washington Post
 Scott Baker – journalist, editor in chief of The Blaze
 Wes Craven, writing and psychology – horror film director
 Piper Curda – singer and actress
 Ian Eskelin, BA Communications – singer-songwriter, All Star United
 Cathleen Falsani, 1992 – journalist; columnist for Chicago Sun-Times
 Colyn Fischer, Bachelor of Music Performance, 1999 – violinist
 Jason Harrod – singer-songwriter, Harrod and Funck
 Carol Huston – actress, Matlock
 Camille and Kennerly Kitt – twin harpists and actresses
 Margaret Landon, 1925 – author of the novel Anna and the King of Siam
 Elliot Leung – film composer – The Battle at Lake Changjin, the highest grossing non-english film of all time
 Kurt Lightner – artist
 Adam McCune, BA, 2006 – co-author of the novel The Rats of Hamelin
 Sylvia McNair, Bachelor of Music, 1978 – soprano
 John Nelson, Bachelor of Music, 1963, DMUS 1989 – conductor
 Jeffrey Nordling, BA, 1984 – actor
 Martin O'Donnell, Bachelor of Music, 1977 – composer, Halo video game series
 Kate Pierson – singer with the B-52s
 Walter Ratliff, MA Communications – journalist
 Luci Shaw, BA English Literature/New Testament Greek, magna cum laude, poet
 Mischa Willett - poet
 Robert H. Siegel, BA, 1961 – poet, novelist
 Wendy White, Bachelor of Music, 1975 – mezzo-soprano
 Douglas Yeo, Bachelor of Music, 1976 – bass trombonist
 Ken Klippenstein, Bachelor of Arts English Literature, 2010 – Journalist

Politics
 David J. Apol – Acting Director of U.S. Office of Government Ethics (2017–2018)
 Torrey C. Brown – Secretary, Maryland Department of Natural Resources
 Dan Coats – Director of National Intelligence (2017–2019), U.S. Senator (R-IN) (1989–1999, 2011–2017)
 Michael Gerson – senior advisor to President George W. Bush (2000–2006)
 Richard C. Halverson – chaplain, U.S. Senate (1981–1994)
 Dennis Hastert – U.S. Representative (R-IL) (1987–2007), former Speaker of the House
 Paul B. Henry – U.S. Representative (R-MI) (1985–1993)
 David Iglesias – U.S. Attorney, District of New Mexico (2001–2006)
 Jim McDermott – U.S. Representative (D-WA) (1989–2017)
 Russell Vought – Director, Office of Management and Budget (2020–2021)
 Tim Walberg – U.S. Representative (R-MI) (2007–2009, 2011–present)
 Timothy Weeden – Wisconsin State Legislature (1987–1997)
 David Young – Nixon administration (1970–1973); co-founder of the Nixon Administration's White House Plumbers

Religion
 Juanita Breckenridge Bates – Congregationalist minister
 Rob Bell – founding pastor of Mars Hill Bible Church and featured speaker in NOOMA films
 Paul-Gordon Chandler – Episcopal priest, author and interfaith advocate
 Edmund Clowney – theologian and president of Westminster Theological Seminary
 Mal Couch – founder and president of the Tyndale Theological Seminary
 William Lane Craig – apologist, professor of philosophy at Talbot School of Theology, author of The Kalam Cosmological Argument
 Chip Edgar – Anglican bishop of South Carolina
 Jim Elliot – martyred missionary
 Elisabeth Elliot – author, noted missionary; widow of Jim Elliot
 David Otis Fuller – author, pastor, founder of the "Which Bible?" Society, editor of the Baptist Bulletin
 Bill Gothard – minister and author, former president of the Institute in Basic Life Principles
 Billy Graham – evangelist
 Ruth Graham – author and poet, wife of Billy Graham
 Carl F. H. Henry – first editor-in-chief of the magazine Christianity Today
 Paul King Jewett – theologian and professor at Fuller Theological Seminary
 Daniel C. Juster – leader in the Messianic Judaism movement
 Harold Lindsell – former editor of the magazine Christianity Today
 Ed McCully – martyred missionary
 Josh McDowell – Christian apologist
 Alvera Mickelsen, 1942 – writer, journalism professor, advocate of Christian feminism and co-founder of Christians for Biblical Equality
 John Ortberg – pastor and author
 John Piper – pastor and author
 Stewart Ruch – Anglican bishop of the Upper Midwest
 Nate Saint – martyred missionary
 Steve Saint – author, missionary; son of Nate Saint
 Burton Smith – minister and community organizer
 Jon M. Sweeney – author, editor, book publisher
 Kenneth N. Taylor – paraphraser of The Living Bible and founder of Tyndale Publishers
 A. W. Tozer – minister and author
 John Walvoord – author and former president of Dallas Theological Seminary
 Gary Wilde – minister and author
 Philip Yancey – author and editor

Science
 James S. Albus (1935–2011), B.S. 1957 – engineer at the National Institute of Standards and Technology
 Harold Alden (1890–1964), 1912 – astronomer
Arthur J. Ammann, 1958 –  pediatric immunologist; pioneer in understanding HIV transmission, helped develop pneumococcal vaccine 
 Paul Werner Gast (1930–1973), 1952 – geochemist and geologist
 J. Laurence Kulp (1921–2006), 1942 – geochemist; pioneer in radiometric dating methods
 Ronald C. Phillips (1932–2005), 1954 – marine botanist; pioneer in seagrass science
 John Wesley Powell (1834–1902), – 19th-century geologist and explorer of the American West
 Dr. Taylor McKenzie  - The first  Navajo to graduate from a medical school. A surgeon and former Navajo Nation Vice President.

Sports
 Marshall Hollingsworth, 2015 – professional soccer player
 Pete Ittersagen, 2009 – NFL cornerback, Tennessee Titans
 Donnie Nelson, 1986 – General Manager, Dallas Mavericks
 Mel Peterson, 1960 – former NBA player
 Randy Pfund, 1974 – General Manager, Miami Heat
 Andy Studebaker, 2008 – NFL linebacker, Kansas City Chiefs

Other
 Todd Beamer, 1991 – passenger aboard United Airlines Flight 93
 Clinton F. Irwin – Justice of the Oklahoma Territorial Supreme Court (1899–1907)
 Raymond Joseph, 1960 – former Haitian Ambassador to the United States
 Trevor N. McFadden, 2001 – Judge of the United States District Court for the District of Columbia
 Samuel H. Sedgwick, Justice of the Nebraska Supreme Court
 Edward Breathitte Sellers, 1866 – first Wheaton College graduate of color
 Timothy Stoen, 1960 – member of Peoples Temple; Jonestown defector
 Dave Theurer – game designer; created Missile Command and Tempest for Atari
 R. Timothy Ziemer – Navy admiral and global health expert

References

Wheaton College alumni